Dipak Rai (sometimes spelled Deepak) is a Nepali professional footballer who currently plays for Manang Marshyangdi Club as a forward.

Club career

Machhindra
In the 2012 Pokhara cup in a match against Calcutta Post Trust Rai scored a hat-trick and also assisted one of Bishal Rai's two goals in a 6-0 victory.

Manang Marshyangdi
In March 2013 Rai joined the Manang Marshyangdi Club for an undisclosed fee. After scoring a goal on his debut Rai commented that it had been his "Manang Marshyangdi is my dream team". He in the thirty-second minute in a 12-0 win over Tushal Youth Club.

In the Semifinals of the 2013 Pokhara Cup Rai scored the first goal in a 2-1 win over Nepal Army Club. Manang Marshyangdi went on to win the tournament and Rai was nominated to be player of the tournament. As a result, Rai was gifted a motorcycle and 15,000 rupees.

In the group stage of the 2014 AFC President's Cup in a match against Svay Rieng Rai scored twice in a 6-3 victory.

On 16 November 2014 Rai came on as a sub and scored a consolation goal in a 2-1 loss to Indian side Pune F.C. in a match at the 2014 Bhutanese King's Cup. In the next match Rai scored the second goal in a 3-0 win over Assam Electricity FC.

International career
Rai was called up to play for Nepal in 2011, however coach Graham Roberts exuded Rai and teammate Bijaya Gurung for not turning up to training.

Rai made his debut on 19 November in a match against India in Siliguri, coming on as a sub for Anil Gurung in the 50th minute. In March 2014 Rai was called up for a match against Yemen. He replaced Raju Tamang in a 2-0 loss.

In April 2014 Rai was called to the national team for a friendly against the Philippines He started that match in what proved to be a 3-0 loss.

Honors

Club
Manang Marshyangdi Club
Martyr's Memorial A-Division League: 2013–14

Personal life
Rai hails from Pathari, Nepal. In May 2014 Rai honored fellow Pathari footballer Jeewan Rai in an event where Dipak handed over U.K. sponsored gear to Jeewan.

References

External links
 Dipak Rai GoalNepal.com Profile
 

Living people
People from Morang District
Nepalese footballers
Nepal international footballers
Manang Marshyangdi Club players
Association football forwards
Year of birth missing (living people)
Machhindra F.C. players